Nazirhat College is a secondary higher education institution situated at Hathazari, Chittagong. It is located on the bank of the river Halda and was established in 1949 on the north side of Hathazari area. It was the only institution for study before creating University of Chittagong in this area. On 10 January 2016, water recourse minister Anisul Islam laid the foundation stone for building an academic building and an administrative building of the college. The first principal was Hirendra Lal Sengupta. It was converted to a university college in 1962.

See also 
 List of colleges in Chittagong

References

Colleges in Chittagong